The  2013 Mogadishu Turkish embassy attack  occurred on 27 July 2013 when al-Shaabab militants attacked the Turkish embassy in the Somali capital of Mogadishu, killing 3 people and injuring 9 others. At around 5:00 p.m. a minivan rigged with explosives detonated near the embassy compound. The explosion was followed by three armed militants attempting to storm the compound on foot, but they were repelled and killed by Turkish and Somali security guards.

Al-Shabaab claimed responsibility for the attack in a statement. saying “Mujahideen forces in Mogadishu have just carried out an operation targeting a group of Turkish diplomats in Hodan district.” The U.S. State Department labeled the attack a "cowardly act" while the United Nations Security Council released a statement condemning it in "strongest terms."

See also
 June 2013 Mogadishu attack
 2009 African Union base bombings in Mogadishu
 2015 Ministry of Higher Education attack

References

Suicide car and truck bombings in Africa
Somali Civil War (2009–present)
Attacks in Africa in 2013
Mass murder in 2013
Al-Shabaab (militant group) attacks
Islamic terrorist incidents in 2013
Suicide bombings in Somalia
Attacks on diplomatic missions in Somalia
21st century in Mogadishu
July 2013 crimes in Africa
2013 in Somalia
Somalia–Turkey relations
2013 crimes in Somalia